Pseudaspidimerus flaviceps, is a species of lady beetle native to India, and Sri Lanka.

Description
Body color differ in Indian form and Sri Lankan form. In Indian form, body is completely plain yellowish to reddish brown in color. But in Sri Lankan form, body is almost black except apical and external borders which are pale reddish brown or sometimes with black elytra surrounding a yellow discal mark. Prosternal carinae is subparallel to slightly divergent in the anterior half. grub is light yellow in color.

Biology
It is a predator of several whiteflies, aphids and scale insects such as Aphis gossypii, Aphis spiraecola, Aleurodicus dispersus and Quadraspidiotus perniciosus.

References 

Coccinellidae
Insects of Sri Lanka
Beetles described in 1859